Meathook Seed was an industrial metal music project formed in 1992 by the Napalm Death guitarist, Mitch Harris. Two Meathook Seed albums were released.

Embedded 
Meathook Seed's first album, Embedded, was released in 1993 by Earache Records. The band consisted at that time of Harris and the Obituary members Donald Tardy and Trevor Peres. Peres, being Obituary's guitarist, took the role of vocalist here. The album had two instrumental tracks on it: "Embedded" and "Sea of Tranquility", the latter a nearly 14-minute-long hypnotic track of alienating and electronic sounds, with samples by Shane Embury (also of Napalm Death fame) and Steve Guney. Earlier prints of the album used printed semi-transparent paper along with thick, coated paper for the artwork, while later editions used regular paper only.

Basic Instructions Before Leaving Earth (B.I.B.L.E.) 
In 1999, Meathook Seed released a second album, Basic Instructions Before Leaving Earth (B.I.B.L.E.), recorded by Paul "Bag" Siddens and Si Reeves at Framework Studios in Birmingham. With the original Obituary members replaced, the band's sound changed from industrial metal to a more industrial rock sound. The French Out vocalist, Christophe Lamouret, took on the vocals, while the former Benediction drummer, Ian Treacy, took on the percussion and the Napalm Death bass guitarist, Shane Embury, joined on bass guitar. A session guitarist, Russ Russell, was also added to complete the line-up with Harris.

Former members 
Mitch Harris – guitar, programming
Christophe Lamouret – vocals
Ian Treacy – drums, percussion
Shane Embury – bass guitar
Russ Russell – guitar
Donald Tardy – drums
Trevor Peres – vocals

References

External links 
 Official website
 Meathook Seed on MySpace

Industrial metal musical groups
Musical groups established in 1992
Death metal musical groups